The Mohawk Valley Landsharks were a minor league baseball team based in Little Falls, New York in the state's Mohawk Valley region.  The team played its games in The Northeast League (later known as the Can-Am League.  The Northeast League was an independent baseball league and as such none of its teams had an affiliation with Major League Baseball.  The team existed for just one season, 1995, and played its home games at Little Falls Veterans Memorial Park.

History 
When the Northeast League was formed and played its first season in 1995 it was a 6-team league with all six teams being located in the State of New York.  The Landsharks would be one of those six original teams. The Landsharks would have a very successful season in their first year, finishing 2nd in the league with a 47-23 record.  They would make the Northeast League playoffs, but lose in the first round.  Although the team played very well on the field, the club was plagued by poor attendance numbers.  At the end of the season the team would fold and be replaced by The Rhode Island Tiger Sharks, who would suffer the same fate as the Landsharks, only lasting one season.

References

Northern League (baseball, 1993–2010) teams
Defunct baseball teams in New York (state)
Defunct independent baseball league teams
Baseball teams disestablished in 1995
1995 establishments in New York (state)
Herkimer County, New York
1995 disestablishments in New York (state)
Baseball teams established in 1995